The second season of Ilha Record premiered on Monday, July 18, 2022, at  on RecordTV.

The show features a group of celebrities, known as Explorers, living together on a desert island and competing against each other in extreme challenges to avoid  being exiled and continue their quest for lost treasures and the grand prize of R$500.000. Prior to the live finale, a public vote is held to determine who would become the season's Favorite Explorer and win the special prize of R$250.000.

Nakagima won competition after defeating Kaik Pereira at the Island's final treasure hunt and took home the grand prize of R$500.000. Solange Gomes won the public's special prize of R$250.000 with 49.82% of the final vote against Ste Viegas, Bruno Sutter and Caique Aguiar. In addition, Kaik Pereira received R$100.000 as runner-up, while Fábio Braz earned R$30.000 for being part of Nakagima's crew in the final.

Cast

Explorers
The celebrities were officially revealed by RecordTV on June 26, 2022.

The game

Maps progress

Voting history

Notes

Exiles' power

Crew status

Public' favorite's results

Ratings and reception

Brazilian ratings
All numbers are in points and provided by Kantar Ibope Media.

References

External links
 Ilha Record 2 on R7.com

2022 Brazilian television seasons
Ilha Record